Leszczków  is a village in the administrative district of Gmina Lipnik, within Opatów County, Świętokrzyskie Voivodeship, in south-central Poland.

The village has a population of 450.

References

Villages in Opatów County